"New Amsterdam" is the fourth episode of the first season of the American television drama series Mad Men. It was written by Lisa Albert and directed by Tim Hunter. The episode originally aired on the AMC channel in the United States on August 9, 2007.

Plot
Pete's new wife Trudy surprises and annoys him with an unannounced visit to the office for lunch, and she then surprises him again by taking him to see a large apartment she wants to buy. Pete protests that this is far too expensive for his current wage. 

Pete, Don, and Sal meet with a prospective client, Bethlehem Steel, to pitch a new idea. Don is enraged when the client expresses great enthusiasm for Pete's idea and tells him to pack his things. Don and Roger meet with the company's senior partner, Bert Cooper, who tells them that they cannot fire Pete due to his family's extensive connections with New York's hereditary wealthy elite.

Pete and Trudy later inspect their prospective home. When a new neighbor says how impressed she is by all that Trudy has been telling her about Pete's Knickerbocker connections, Pete suspects the true reason for his remaining at Sterling Cooper.

Meanwhile, Betty begins a tentative friendship with Helen Bishop after helping Helen to evade her ex-husband.

Cultural references
Pete and his co-workers listen to the comedy album The Button-Down Mind of Bob Newhart, which Paul Kinsey compares unfavorably with Lenny Bruce. Don discusses an ad that will play during commercial breaks of Bonanza. Pete offers to take a client to a production of Bye Bye Birdie. Helen volunteers for John F. Kennedy's presidential campaign. Roger reads a copy of the New York Herald Tribune in one scene. Bert Cooper hums the children's song "This Old Man" after admonishing Don and Roger and saving Pete Campbell's career.

Reception
The episode received positive reviews from critics. Alan Sepinwall, writing for New Jersey's The Star-Ledger, praised the episode for developing and "humanizing" the character of Pete Campbell" Andrew Johnston, writing for Slant Magazine similarly praised the episode for its development of Pete's character, as well as John Slattery's performance. Emily VanDerWerff, writing for The A.V. Club in 2013, claimed that the episode was an example of how the series was "capable of such remarkable transcendence."

References

External links
"New Amsterdam" at AMC

Mad Men (season 1) episodes
2007 American television episodes